Ernst Schybergson (29 January 1891 – 17 March 1966) was a Finnish tennis player. He competed in the men's singles and doubles events at the 1924 Summer Olympics.

He also played football as a forward. He made one appearance for the Finland national team in 1911.

References

External links
 

1891 births
1966 deaths
Finnish male tennis players
Olympic tennis players of Finland
Tennis players at the 1924 Summer Olympics
Sportspeople from Helsinki
Finnish footballers
Finland international footballers
Association football forwards